Paolo Reni was an Italian art director.

Selected filmography
 The Doctor's Secret (1931)
 Television (1931)
 Queen of the Night (1931)
 A Woman Has Fallen (1941)

References

Bibliography 
 Waldman, Harry. Missing Reels: Lost Films of American and European Cinema. McFarland, 2000.

External links 
 

Year of birth unknown
Year of death unknown
Italian art directors